Dodleston is a civil parish in Cheshire West and Chester, England.  It contains 13 listed buildings that are included in the National Heritage List for England and designated by English Heritage at Grade II.  This grade is the lowest of the three gradings given to listed buildings and is applied to "buildings of national importance and special interest".  Apart from the village of Dodleston, the parish is rural.  The village is part of the Eaton estate of the Grosvenor family.  The listed buildings in the parish are mainly domestic or related to farming, and some of them were commissioned by members of the Grosvenor family.

See also

Listed buildings in Chester
Listed buildings in Eaton
Listed buildings in Eccleston
Listed buildings in Lower Kinnerton
Listed buildings in Marlston-cum-Lache
Listed buildings in Poulton
Listed buildings in Pulford

References
Citations

Sources

Listed buildings in Cheshire West and Chester
Lists of listed buildings in Cheshire